Mieldes is one of 54 parish councils in Cangas del Narcea, a municipality within the province and autonomous community of Asturias, in northern Spain.

Villages
 Deigüeñu
 Mieldes

References

Parishes in Cangas del Narcea